Cnemaspis lineogularis, also known as the stripe-throated rock gecko, is a species of gecko endemic to Thailand.

References

Cnemaspis
Fauna of Thailand
Reptiles described in 2017